Mount Ortigara (2,105 m, 6,906 ft) is one of the peaks, about 2,000 m (6,000 feet) tall, which delimit to the north the Seven Municipalities Plateau (in Italian: Altipiano dei Sette Comuni), falling sheer on the underlying Sugana Valley with a jump of over 1,500 meters (4,500 feet). With the neighbouring mountains, it forms an imposing ridge easily accessible from the Asiago Plateau, but only reachable through steep paths from the Sugana Valley.

In World War I, it became the theatre of fierce fighting (which became known as the Battle of Mount Ortigara) between Italians and Austro-Hungarians, both of whom fell by the thousand trying to conquer its summit.

References

Mountains of Veneto
Vicentine Alps
Mountains of the Alps
Mountains of Italy